Adolf Aebersold (born 29 March 1909, date of death unknown) was a Swiss racewalker. He competed in the men's 50 kilometres walk at the 1936 Summer Olympics.

References

External links
 

1909 births
Year of death missing
Athletes (track and field) at the 1936 Summer Olympics
Swiss male racewalkers
Olympic athletes of Switzerland
Place of birth missing